Claudia  Maria Presăcan (born 28 December 1979 in Sibiu) is a Romanian artistic gymnast who competed at the senior international level between 1994 and 2000. She was a three-time team gold medalist at the World Championships with the Romanian team and was also a member of the gold medal-winning Romanian squad at the 2000 Olympics in Sydney.

Early career
Presăcan was born in Sibiu and began gymnastics when she was 4½ years old. She moved to the junior Romanian national training center in Bucharest in 1993 and began competing internationally the same year, placing third overall and winning two silver medals at the Top Gym junior tournament in Charleroi, Belgium. In 1994 she participated in the Junior European Championships, where she won a gold medal on floor exercise.

Senior career
Presăcan moved into senior competition later in 1994, participating in the 1994 Team World Championships with the Romanian team and contributing to their gold medal performance. She was also a member of the first-place Romanian team the following year at the 1995 World Championships in Sabae. However, she missed the 1996 Olympics due to a broken hand.

Presăcan returned to competition in 1997, winning her third World Championships medal with the Romanian team at that year's World Championships in Lausanne. Injuries kept her from the 1999 team, but she recovered in time to earn a place on the Romanian squad at the 2000 Olympics. She contributed to the team's gold medal and qualified for the balance beam event final, where she placed fourth, just out of the medals.

After the conclusion of the Games, it was revealed that Presăcan had competed with a severe case of anemia. Despite having a hemoglobin level of 6.3, she had been cleared to compete by team physician Ioachim Oana.

Post-retirement
After Presăcan retired from gymnastics in late 2000, she had a brief career in rowing, serving as a coxswain for the Romanian rowing team at the 2001 University Games.

In 2002, Presăcan, along with former teammates Corina Ungureanu and Lavinia Miloșovici, sparked controversy by posing naked in photographs for a Japanese photobook, LCC Gold , and performing gymnastics routines topless for the Japanese DVDs Gold Bird and Euro Angels. A number of photographs from the photobook and DVDs were subsequently published in the Japanese magazine Shukan Gendai, and an edited version of the DVDs entitled 3 Gold Girls was released in Germany in 2004. Because the gymnasts had posed for some of the photographs and footage wearing their official Romanian team leotards, the Romanian Gymnastics Federation banned them from coaching and judging in the country for five years, and the Japanese Junior Gymnastic Club Federation contemplated banning Romanian gymnasts from a major international junior competition.

Presăcan is currently working as a coach on the Isle of Man.

Major results

1994 Junior Europeans: 7th AA, 4th V, 1st FX
1994 World Team Championships: 1st team
1995 World Championships: 1st team
1997 International Team Championships: 1st team
1997 Romanian National Championships: 1st AA, 1st UB, 3rd BB, 2nd FX
1997 World Championships: 1st team, 8th AA, 5th UB, 6th FX
1998 Women's Artistic Championships: 2nd team
1998 International Team Championships: 2nd team
1998 European Championships: 1st Team, 3rd AA, 3rd UB
1998 Romanian National Championships: 1st BB
1999 International Team Championships: 1st team
2000 Romanian National Championships: 5th AA, 2nd BB
2000 Olympic Games: 1st T, 4th BB

Key: AA: all-around; BB: balance beam; FX: floor exercise; UB: uneven bars; VT: vault

References

External links
 
 
Bio at romanian-gymnastics.com
List of competitive results at Gymn Forum

1979 births
Living people
Romanian female artistic gymnasts
Olympic gymnasts of Romania
Olympic gold medalists for Romania
Olympic medalists in gymnastics
Gymnasts at the 2000 Summer Olympics
Medalists at the World Artistic Gymnastics Championships
Sportspeople from Sibiu
Medalists at the 2000 Summer Olympics
European champions in gymnastics